The Manitoba Grey Party was a political party in Manitoba, Canada, focusing on senior's issues.  The party appears to have been founded in 2002, at the same time as the Grey Party of Canada and other provincial Grey Parties.

The national party was formed to address the health needs of seniors, and was particularly concerned with the high cost of prescription drugs.  It also promoted a "right-wing populist" ideology on other issues, claiming that Canada's legal profession held too much sway over government policy.  It is likely that the provincial party advocated similar positions.

The Grey Party may have attempted to register with Elections Manitoba before the 2003 provincial election; if so, it was unsuccessful.  The party does not appear to have sponsored any candidates in the election.

The Grey Party of Canada seems to have collapsed later in 2003, and it is not clear if the Manitoba organization still exists.

The Manitoba Grey Party's first (and perhaps only) leader was Lou Hemming.

See also:  Political parties of Canada

Provincial political parties in Manitoba
Defunct political parties in Canada
Pensioners' parties
Political parties established in 2002
2002 establishments in Manitoba